The anaphylatoxin receptors are a group of G-protein coupled receptors which bind anaphylatoxins.  Members of this family include:

 C3a receptor 
 C5a receptor 
 C5L2

References

External links
 

G protein-coupled receptors